Hopland (formerly Sanel) is a census-designated place in Mendocino County, California, United States. The population was 661 at the 2020 census, down from 756 at the 2010 census.

Hopland is located at the start of the North Coast or Redwood Coast region of Northern California. Hopland is a rustic farming community situated among oak-covered coastal foothills. Summer temperatures can exceed .

Historic buildings in town include the old Hopland High School (c. 1923–1965), currently the Bluebird Cafe, the Brutocao Cellars tasting room; as well as the Thatcher Hotel, built in the late 1800s and recently reopened after undergoing a complete renovation. Other establishments in Hopland include Cafe Poppy, The Golden Pig, Hopland Tap House, Brutocao Cellars, Saracina Winery, Campovida Winery and Fetzer Vineyards, a major producer of both red and white wines in North America, including Zinfandel, Chardonnay and Merlot.

Geography
Hopland is in southeastern Mendocino County, along U.S. Route 101, which leads north-northwest  to Ukiah, the county seat, and southeast  to Santa Rosa, the Sonoma County seat. The Russian River flows southward through the eastern side of the community, separating the main village of Hopland from Old Hopland, also part of the CDP, on the eastern side of the river.

Climate

History

The settlement that became Hopland was originally called "Sanel". Over the years it was centered on either side of the Russian River. Sanel began on the west bank of the river in 1859. In 1874, the town moved to the east bank to be connected to the toll road built to there. When the railroad arrived on the west side of the river, the town moved back to its original site, leaving Old Hopland on the east bank.

The Sanel post office opened in 1860, closed for a time in 1869, moved and changed its name to Hopland in 1879, reverted to its original site and name in 1890, and finally changed its name back to Hopland in 1891. The town gets its name from the fact that from the 1870s to the mid-1950s, much of the region's economy was based on the growing and drying of bitter hops, a key flavoring and preservative in beer. Downy mildew pushed hops out of the area completely by the late 1950s.

Demographics

The 2010 United States Census reported that Hopland had a population of 756. The racial makeup of Hopland was 521 (68.9%) White, 4 (0.5%) African American, 38 (5.0%) Native American, 10 (1.3%) Asian, 0 (0.0%) Pacific Islander, 142 (18.8%) from other races, and 41 (5.4%) from two or more races. Hispanic or Latino of any race were 263 persons (34.8%).

The Census reported that 739 people (97.8% of the population) lived in households, 17 (2.2%) lived in non-institutionalized group quarters, and 0 (0%) were institutionalized.

There were 263 households, out of which 94 (35.7%) had children under the age of 18 living in them, 117 (44.5%) were opposite-sex married couples living together, 37 (14.1%) had a female householder with no husband present, 29 (11.0%) had a male householder with no wife present.  There were 28 (10.6%) unmarried opposite-sex partnerships, and 4 (1.5%) same-sex married couples or partnerships. 56 households (21.3%) were made up of individuals, and 12 (4.6%) had someone living alone who was 65 years of age or older. The average household size was 2.81.  There were 183 families (69.6% of all households); the average family size was 3.27.

The population was spread out, with 195 people (25.8%) under the age of 18, 77 people (10.2%) aged 18 to 24, 211 people (27.9%) aged 25 to 44, 216 people (28.6%) aged 45 to 64, and 57 people (7.5%) who were 65 years of age or older.  The median age was 34.6 years. For every 100 females, there were 124.3 males.  For every 100 females age 18 and over, there were 122.6 males.

The homeowner vacancy rate was 2.7%; the rental vacancy rate was 6.1%.  272 people (36.0% of the population) lived in owner-occupied housing units and 467 people (61.8%) lived in rental housing units.

Government

Media
 KORB 88.7 MHz, the only FM broadcast station licensed to Hopland

See also
 Northwestern Pacific Railroad

References

Census-designated places in Mendocino County, California
Census-designated places in California